Seán Ó Tuama (1926 – 14 October 2006) was an Irish poet, playwright and academic.

Life
Raised in the southern city of Cork and educated at the North Monastery (North Mon) school and University College Cork, Ó Tuama first came to prominence in 1950 with his anthology of modern Irish language poetry titled Nuabhéarsaíocht 1939-1949.

Notable academic works include An Grá in Amhráin na nDaoine, an analysis of medieval and Renaissance European influences on Irish song,  which is credited as being a source for inspiration for poets including Liam Ó Muirthile and Gabriel Rosenstock. The anthology An Duanaire: Poems of the Dispossessed, a collection of  poems in the Irish language dating from the 16th to 19th centuries selected by Ó Tuama and  accompanied by translations of the poems into English by Thomas Kinsella, was published in 1981.

Ó Tuama was the Professor of Irish Literature at University College Cork, and visiting professor at Harvard, Oxford and Toronto University. He was also chairman of Bord na Gaeilge for a time, and a member of the Arts Council of Ireland.

Awards
 1983 American Book Award

Works

Poetry
 Faoileán Na Beatha (Baile Átha Cliath, An Chlochomar Tta., 1962)

Plays
 
 Ar aghaidh linn, a Longadáin
 Moloney
 Is é seo m'oileán
 Corp Eoghain Uí Shúilleabháin
 Déan trócaire ar shagairt óga
 Iúdás Iscariot agus a bhean
 Scéal ar Phádraig

Academic works
 An Grá in Amhráin na nDaoine (An Clochomhar Tta., 1960)
 An Grá i bhFilíocht na nUaisle (1988)

Anthologies
 
 Coiscéim na hAoise Seo, an anthology of 20th century poetry in Irish

Essays
 Cúirt, Tuath agus Bruachbhaile, An Clóchomhar Tta, 1990
 Nuabhéarsaíocht 1939-1949 (as editor, Baile Atha Cliath, Sairseal agus Dill, 1950)

References

External links
https://web.archive.org/web/20090717102354/http://www.irishwriters-online.com/seanotuama.html

1926 births
2006 deaths
Academics of University College Cork
Alumni of University College Cork
Irish male poets
Irish male dramatists and playwrights
Irish-language poets
Harvard University staff
20th-century Irish poets
20th-century male writers
20th-century Irish dramatists and playwrights
American Book Award winners